Ol' Yellow Eyes Is Back is an album by Brent Spiner, best known for his role as Data in the American television series Star Trek: The Next Generation, first released in June 1991. The title is a parodic reference both to Frank Sinatra's Ol' Blue Eyes Is Back and the Data character, whose eyes are golden yellow. On the album, Spiner is backed by the orchestra from that series as he sings a number of old pop standards, mostly from the 1930s and 1940s.

Background
In the liner notes, Spiner wrote of Sinatra's "You Make Me Feel So Young":

Sinatra at his awesome best. This song and dozens of others accompanied every dinner I ate between the ages of five and thirteen. My stepfather, an amateur saxophone player and a hell of a mambo dancer, had put together one of the all time great collections of popular music recordings anywhere. So, to my good fortune, we dined each night with the likes of Ol' Blue Eyes, Judy Garland, Nat "King" Cole, Rosemary Clooney, Louis Prima and Keely Smith and every other singer that ever performed on Capitol, Decca or R.C.A. records.

Production
Spiner had help from a number of his colleagues from Star Trek: TNG. Wendy Neuss, associate producer for the series, and Dennis McCarthy, who scored the music for many of the episodes, co-produced the album with Spiner. Several fellow cast members (LeVar Burton, Michael Dorn, Jonathan Frakes, and Patrick Stewart) even joined him to sing "It's a Sin (To Tell a Lie)," appearing under the group name of "The Sunspots", a word play on The Ink Spots, the first group to perform this song. McCarthy praised the recording experience, and compared it to the time he spent earlier in his career on tour with Glen Campbell.

Release
According to Spiner, the album was released in Europe against his wishes after he had rejected attempts by the record company to renegotiate his contract.

Track listing
"Time After Time" (w. Sammy Cahn m. Jule Styne)
"The Very Thought of You" (w.m. Ray Noble)
"More Than You Know" (w. Edward Eliscu & Billy Rose m. Vincent Youmans)
"Toot Toot Tootsie" (w.m. Ted Fio Rito, Robert A. King, Gus Kahn & Ernie Erdman)
"Embraceable You" (w. Ira Gershwin m. George Gershwin)
"It's a Sin (To Tell a Lie)" (w.m. Billy Mayhew)
"Long, Long Time" (w. Sammy Cahn m. Jule Styne)
"Carolina in the Morning" (w. Gus Kahn m. Walter Donaldson)
"Marie" (Randy Newman)
"Zing! Went the Strings of My Heart" (w.m. James F. Hanley)
"When I Fall in Love" (w. Edward Heyman m. Victor Young)
"Goodnight, Sweetheart" (w.m. Ray Noble, Jimmy Campbell, Reg Connelly, adapted by Rudy Vallee)

Personnel
Brent Spiner: Lead vocals
The Sunspots: Back-up vocals for "It's a Sin (To Tell a Lie)"
LeVar Burton
Michael Dorn
Jonathan Frakes
Patrick Stewart
Ralph Humphrey: drums
Ken Wild: Bass
George Doering: Guitar
Jim Cox: Piano
John Kavanaugh: Piano
Bob O'Donnell: Trumpet
Bob Findley: Trumpet
John Rosenberg: Trumpet
Dick Hyde: Trombone
Lew McCreary: Trombone
Ernie Carlson: Trombone
Pete Christlieb: Woodwinds
Gene Cipriano: Woodwinds
Brian O'Connor: French horn
Joe Meyer: French horn
Asa Drori: String concertmaster
Bob Joyce: Additional back-up vocals on "It's A Sin"
David Joyce: Additional back-up vocals on "It's A Sin"
Randy Crenshaw: Additional back-up vocals on "It's A Sin"

References

1991 debut albums
Brent Spiner albums